Unisto is a Swiss company that specialises in security products. It produces Unisto security seals, name badges and brand profiling products to guarantee the authenticity of a product from its manufacturing origin to its point of sale.

It was founded as Stoffel and Co. in Horn, Switzerland in 1926, a small family-owned business making packaging accessories used for brand labeling and securing products. The company later became an international company with more than 600 employees in factories and offices worldwide.

References

Service companies of Switzerland